Ariful Hasan (born 7 March 1986) is a Bangladeshi cricketer. He made his Twenty20 debut for Abahani Limited in the 2018–19 Dhaka Premier Division Twenty20 Cricket League on 25 February 2019.

References

External links
 

1986 births
Living people
Bangladeshi cricketers
Abahani Limited cricketers
Chittagong Division cricketers
Prime Bank Cricket Club cricketers
Place of birth missing (living people)